The Stanford University School of Humanities and Sciences is the heart of the undergraduate program and grants the majority of Stanford University's degrees. The School has 23 departments and
20 interdisciplinary degree-granting programs. The School was officially created in 1948, from the merger of the Schools of Biological Sciences, Humanities, Physical Sciences, and Social Sciences.  Those schools date from the mid-1920s when the university first organized individual departments into schools.

Departments

The school is divided into three divisions: Humanities and Arts, Natural Sciences, and Social Sciences.

Humanities and Arts 

 Art & Art History - One of the original University departments under the name Drawing (1891), Drawing and Painting (1892-1900), back to Drawing (1901–1907), Graphic Arts (1908–1910), Graphic Art (1911–1913, 1927–1947), then Art and Architecture (1948–1969), Art (1970-?) and finally its current name.
 Classics - Stanford started with separate departments for Latin and Greek but these were merged in 1921
 Drama - Started as Public Speaking in 1927 became Speech and Drama in 1937 and Drama in 1971
 East Asian Languages and Cultures
 English - one of the original departments but under the name English Language and Literature
 History - one of the original departments
 Linguistics - established in 1971
 Music - established in 1936
 Philosophy - established sometime in the 1890s
 Religious Studies - started in 1941 as the department of Religion

Division of Literatures, Cultures, and Languages
 Comparative Literature
 French and Italian - one of the original departments under the name Romance Languages which became Romanic Languages.  Became French and Italian in 1963.
 German Studies - one of the original departments under the name Germanic Languages
 Iberian & Latin American Cultures
 Slavic Languages and Literature - established in 1926

Natural Sciences 

 Applied Physics - established in 1969
 Biology
 Chemistry - one of the original departments
 Mathematics - one of the original departments
 Physics - one of the original departments
 Statistics - established in 1936

The current Biology department was formed by merging Botany, Zoology, Entomology, and Physiology to form Biological Sciences.  The name of this department was changed to Biology in 2009.

Social Sciences 

 Anthropology
 Communication - established in 1927 as Journalism
 Economics - established in 1892 as Economics and Social Sciences
 Political Science
 Psychology - one of the original departments with Frank Angell serving as its first chair. From 1922 to 1942, Lewis Terman served as its chair.  In 2015, it was ranked as #1 in the country among all psychology graduate programs in the United States.
 Sociology

Stanford was set up with a Political Science department but that was almost immediately renamed Economics and Social Science.  The forerunner of the current Political Science department was established in 1918.

Sociology and Anthropology were originally one department established in 1948.  They split in 1957.  Anthropology itself was split into Anthropological Sciences and Cultural and Social Anthropology from
1999 to 2007 but merged again.

Notable faculty in these departments other than those mentioned above include:
Albert Bandura (1925–2021), David Starr Jordan Professor Emeritus of Social Science 
Carol Dweck (born 1946), Lewis and Virginia Eaton Professor of Psychology (2004–)
Phillip Zimbardo (born 1933), professor of psychology (1968-200), known for the Stanford Prison Experiment
Joseph Greenberg (1915–2001), Ray Lyman Wilbur Professor of Social Science, known for his classification of the Niger–Congo languages

Core courses
At times Stanford has required undergraduate students to take core courses in various subjects in the humanities and sciences.  Some of the core courses include
 Western Culture (1980-1988) - freshmen took courses in  both European and non-European cultures with  “a substantial historical dimension” and include works by women and minorities. 
 Cultures, Ideas and Values (CIV) (1988-2000)
 Introduction to the Humanities (IHUM) (2000-2012), a core freshman  course sequence which consisted of one fall-quarter course followed by a 2-quarter pair of courses during the winter and spring quarters. Fall quarter courses were interdisciplinary while winter-spring focused on a specific disciplinary area.
 Thinking Matters (2012–2016)
 Ways of Thinking / Ways of Doing (2016–present)

List of deans 

 Clarence H. Faust, English, 1948–1951
 Douglas Merritt Whitaker, Biology, 1951–1952
 Ray N. Faulkner, Art and Architecture, 1952–1956
 Philip H. Rhinelander, Philosophy, 1956–1961
 Robert Richardson Sears, Psychology, 1961–1970
 Albert H. Hastorf III, Psychology, 1970–1973
 Halsey L. Royden, Mathematics, 1973–1981
 Norman K. Wessells, Biology, 1981–1988
 Ewart A.C. Thomas, Psychology, 1988–1993
 John B. Shoven, Economics, 1993–1998
 Malcolm R. Beasley, Applied Physics, 1998–2001
 Sharon R. Long, Biological Sciences, 2001–2007
 Richard Saller, Classics and History, 2007–2018
 Debra Satz, Philosophy, 2018–present

References

External links
Stanford School of Humanities and Sciences Homepage

Humanities and Sciences
Humanities education
Science education in the United States
 
Science and technology in California
University subdivisions in California
Educational institutions established in 1948
1948 establishments in California